World Focus, or Worldfocus, is an American newscast.

World Focus or Worldfocus may also refer to:

 Ankair, an airline
 A British newscast by Independent Television News